S.W.A.T. is the soundtrack score for the 2003 action film S.W.A.T., based on the 1970s TV series of the same name, composed by Elliot Goldenthal.

Score 
It is generally viewed as being another surprise project for Goldenthal, being that he usually gravitates towards more "intellectual" and "arthouse" type movies. Although he has done a few "commercial" action movie type scores in the past, the decision to score S.W.A.T. was nevertheless interesting, and Goldenthal has developed a reputation for choosing unlikely projects, if anything, for the sheer fun of it. In choosing to compose the score for S.W.A.T., Goldenthal—some have said—had played the "Media Ventures" (now known as Remote Control Productions)  composers at their own game and won; creating an original, intense, yet complex and diverse score.

Track listing 
 Bullet Frenzy (10:17)
 Don't Shoot Me Baby (3:26)
 My Big Black Assault Weapon (1:38)
 AK-47 Scherzo (3:42)
 Three Chords in Two Minutes (1:53)
 Run for Your Life (3:05)
 The Fascist Shuffle (1:29)
 "S.W.A.T. 911"  (3:10) - Danny Saber
 Crash Landing (4:48)
 That Cop Stole My Car (2:04)
 S.W.A.T. Sticker (0:53)
 Bullet Frenzy II (1:38)
 Time is Running Out (4:59) - Apollo Four Forty
 Brother Down (4:24) - Sam Roberts Band
 Samuel Jackson (4:03) - Hot Action Cop
 Figure.09 (3:18) - Linkin Park from the album, Meteora
 Just Because (3:51) - Jane's Addiction

The songs, "Crosstown Traffic" by Jimi Hendrix and “Shattered” by The Rolling Stones are also played during the film, but they are not included in the soundtrack.

References

External links
 
 Varèse Sarabande page for the score.

S.W.A.T. (franchise)
Elliot Goldenthal soundtracks
2003 soundtrack albums
Action film soundtracks
Thriller film soundtracks
Crime film soundtracks